Ramesh Ramdhan (born July 25, 1960) is a football (soccer) referee from Trinidad and Tobago, The first referee from the Caribbean to officiate in the WC Finals (Japan-Croatia) during the 1998 FIFA World Cup held in France.

Ramdhan also officiated at numerous FIFA competitions, including the 1997 FIFA Confederations Cup, the 1995 and 2001 FIFA U-17 World Championships, and qualifying matches for the 1994, 1998, 2002, and 2006 World Cups. He also officiated at the 1993, 1996, 1998, and 2000 CONCACAF Gold Cups.

References

 Profile

Trinidad and Tobago football referees
1998 FIFA World Cup referees
1960 births
Living people
Place of birth missing (living people)
CONCACAF Gold Cup referees
Trinidad and Tobago people of Indian descent